Puketaha is a rural community in the Waikato District and Waikato region of New Zealand's North Island.

Education

References

Waikato District
Populated places in Waikato